Tom Dreyer (born 17 November 1972) is a South African novelist and poet writing in both English and Afrikaans.

He went to school in Johannesburg and Stellenbosch, and studied at the University of Stellenbosch and the University of Cape Town. He is an alumnus of the International Writing Program at the University of Iowa  and has been writer-in-residence at universities and institutes across the world.

He made his writing debut in the poetry anthology Nuwe Stemme (Tafelberg Publishers, 1997) and a number of his poems were subsequently included
in the anthology Afrikaanse Poësie in ‘n Duisend en Enkele Gedigte (1999), compiled by Gerrit Komrij.

Dreyer is better known for his prose work, and he has been awarded or shortlisted for significant South African literary awards.

His latest collection of stories, Kodachrome, was published in August 2022 and has garnered rave reviews.

Novels
Erdvarkfontein, Tafelberg Publishers (1998)
Stinkafrikaners, Tafelberg Publishers(2000)
Equatoria, Tafelberg Publishers (2006)
Dorado, Penguin Random House (2016)
The Long Wave, Penguin Random House (2016)

Short stories
Polaroid, Tafelberg Publishers(2007)
Kodachrome, Protea (2022)

Awards
1998 M-Net Bursary
2001 Eugène Marais Prize for Stinkafrikaners
2007 Equatoria shortlisted for the M-Net Literary Prize
2017 Dorado shortlisted for the University of Johannesburg Fiction Prize (Afrikaans)
2017 The Long Wave longlisted for the Sunday Times Literary Awards Fiction Prize
2019 Tom Dreyer's poem Slaap jy solank dan hou ek die fort won the Afrikaans category of the AVBOB national poetry competition.

References

External links
 Tom Dreyer website
 Author's page at Penguin Random House
 Excerpt from essay in Foreign Policy Magazine
 Interview with Tom Dreyer at The Long Wave & Dorado launch party

Afrikaner people
People from Stellenbosch
South African male novelists
1972 births
Living people
Stellenbosch University alumni
University of Cape Town alumni